Ricky, Rickey, or Rick Jackson may refer to:
Ricky Jackson (Australian footballer), Australian rules footballer
Ricky Jackson (rugby union) (born 1998), New Zealand rugby union player
Ricky Jackson (miscarriage of justice) (born 1957), African American wrongfully convicted of murder
Rickey Jackson (born 1958), former American football linebacker
Rick Jackson (born 1989), basketball player

See also
Richard Jackson (disambiguation)